"Say It" is a song by Australian pop/new wave group Kids in the Kitchen. The song was released in August 1987 as the second single from their second studio album, Terrain (1987). The song peaked at number 31 on the Australian Kent Music Report.

Track listing 
7" (K-368) 
Side A "Say It" -  4:05
Side B "White Love" (Live At The Peking Cultural Centre)  - 4:16

12" (X13294)
Side A "Say It" (Extended Version) - 6:22
Side B "Say It" (Swelter Bound Mix) - 6:25

Charts

References 

1987 songs
1987 singles
Kids in the Kitchen songs
Mushroom Records singles